Majorcan Union was a regional liberal party on the island of Majorca, Spain.
It was founded in October 1982, as a nationalist continuation of the then disintegrating Union of the Democratic Centre (UCD). The main founder was Jeroni Albertí Picornell.

In 1993 it merged with the Unió Independent de Mallorca and Convergència Balear. Subsequently it forged alliances with Independents per Menorca and Unió Centristes de Menorca.

As a centre party, it supported People's Party governments (1987) in the Balearic Islands but also the left-wing coalition, led by the socialist Francesc Antich (Spanish Socialist Workers' Party, PSOE), which replaced the People's Party in 1999. UM was once again was the key element in returning the presidency to Francesc Antich after the regional elections to the Balearic Island parliament held in 2007.

Unió Mallorquina was a member of Liberal International. The last president was Josep Melià i Ques.

Following a number of corruption scandals, the party decided to disband in February 2011 and establish a new party, Convergence for the Isles (Convergència per les Illes).

Electoral performance

Parliament of the Balearic Islands

 * Within People's Party–Majorcan Union

See also
Liberalism
Contributions to liberal theory
Liberalism worldwide
List of liberal parties
Liberal democracy
Liberalism in Spain

References

External links

Liberal parties in Spain
Defunct liberal political parties
Political parties in the Balearic Islands
Political parties established in 1982
Regionalist parties in Spain
Union of the Democratic Centre (Spain)
Political parties disestablished in 2011
1982 establishments in Spain